Longiantrum quadra is a moth of the family Erebidae first described by Michael Fibiger in 2010. It is known from northern Vietnam.

The wingspan is about 10 mm. The head, patagia, anterior part of the tegulae, prothorax, basal part of the costa, costal part of the medial area and the terminal area, including the fringes are dark brown. The costal medial area is quadrangular. The forewing ground colour is yellow, with brown patches, especially along the subterminal and terminal lines. The crosslines are absent, except for an indistinct beige subterminal line. The terminal line is marked by black interneural dots. The hindwing is light grey and fringes beige. The underside of the forewing is light brown, while the underside of the hindwing is light grey.

References

Micronoctuini
Moths described in 2010
Taxa named by Michael Fibiger